Loose Ends (2001) is the first original novel based on the Roswell TV series.

Plot summary
It started out as an innocent road trip to Carlsbad Caverns to unwind, but now Max, Isabel, Michael, Liz, and Maria are totally regretting their plan. Hundreds of feet underground, in the cavern gift shop, Liz turns and is stunned to see someone she thought she'd never meet again—the man who shot her long ago in the diner. Their eyes meet and Liz bolts. But running won't solve the group's new "problem." Because the shooter has recognized Liz. Now he wants her dead. And nobody knows why.

Reception
Don D'Amassa said in his review for Science Fiction Chronicle that "Cox does a craftsman like job of elaborating this minor theme and turning it into a reasonably good adventure."

Trivia
 A large part of this book concerns a day trip to a real New Mexico attraction, the Carlsbad Caverns.

Notes

2001 American novels
American science fiction novels
Novels by Greg Cox
Novels set in New Mexico
Carlsbad Caverns National Park